Teau Moana McKenzie (born 12 March 1995) is a Cook Islands competitive sailor.

She competed at the 2016 Summer Olympics in Rio de Janeiro, in the women's Laser Radial, where she finished in 35th place.

References

External links

1995 births
Living people
Cook Island female sailors (sport)
Olympic sailors of the Cook Islands
Sailors at the 2016 Summer Olympics – Laser Radial
Cook Island sportswomen